James Banes Blyth (9 August 1911 – 1979) was a Scottish professional footballer who played for Newtongrange, Arniston Rangers, Tottenham Hotspur, Hull City, Heart of Midlothian, Falkirk and St Johnstone.

Football career 
After spells with junior clubs Newtongrange and Armiston Rangers, Blyth joined Tottenham Hotspur in 1936. The centre half featured in 11 matches in his time at White Hart Lane. He moved on to Hull City in 1937 to play in a further 72 matches before having spells at Heart of Midlothian, Falkirk (loan), St Johnstone and Forfar Athletic.

References 

1911 births
1979 deaths
Scottish footballers
Sportspeople from Midlothian
Tottenham Hotspur F.C. players
Hull City A.F.C. players
Heart of Midlothian F.C. players
Falkirk F.C. players
St Johnstone F.C. players
Arniston Rangers F.C. players
Forfar Athletic F.C. players
English Football League players
Scottish Football League players
Date of death missing
Place of death missing
Peebles Rovers F.C. players
Association football central defenders